Georges Kablan Degnan (born 23 April 1953) is an Ivorian sprinter. He competed in the 200 metres at the 1976 Summer Olympics and the 1984 Summer Olympics.

References

1953 births
Living people
Athletes (track and field) at the 1976 Summer Olympics
Athletes (track and field) at the 1984 Summer Olympics
Ivorian male sprinters
Olympic athletes of Ivory Coast
Universiade medalists in athletics (track and field)
Place of birth missing (living people)
Universiade medalists for Ivory Coast
Medalists at the 1979 Summer Universiade
Medalists at the 1981 Summer Universiade